Sangeetha Rajeev, also known as SaRa is an Indian playback singer and composer. She won the Best International Pop Singer of the year at the VIMA Music Awards in Malaysia. She is the first Independent Artist from Karnataka to collaborate with Sonu Nigam for a Kannada Track called "Neene Neene"  which was also released in Hindi as "Tuhi Tuhi". Her track "Nee Hinga Nodabyada" which was sung, composed and performed by Sangeetha Rajeev remains one of the biggest viral Kannada independent tracks  She is considered to be the first female independent artist in the Kannada music scene who also introduced the genre Ka pop (Kannada Pop, ಕ pop).

She entered the Telugu Independent music scene with her hit single "Naa Raju" which was supported by the Tollywood industry and launched by the legendary RP Patnaik, Sricharan Pakala, Noel Sean, Rahul Sipligunj and Rollrida.

On account of world music day, YouTube featured Sangeetha Rajeev on the front page of major new paper publications  making her the first and only artist from Karnataka to be featured by YouTube as a part of Creating for India  campaign

She is now all set to make her acting debut in a Hindi feature film 'Red Collar' starring Kishore Kumar G in the lead.

Early life

Sangeetha Rajeev was born Bangalore to a musical family. Her father S Rajeev was a bank manager, who had to move to Mumbai on an official transfer. She along with her family moved to Mumbai at the age of 6 where she spent most of her childhood. In Mumbai she was trained in Bharatnatyam and Carnatic classical music. She is also trained in Hindustani classical music.

Sangeetha did most of her schooling in Mumbai. Sangeetha graduated in information science engineering. She then moved to England to work before returning to India to pursue music.

Career 
Sangeetha started her career from Kannada films. She was introduced to this industry by the music composer Dharma Vish. She sang a song in the film Aane Pataaki for which she also won the best playback singer award the same year. She was then introduced to the Tollywood industry by the Kshanam music composer Sricharan Pakala and director Shreeranjani through actor/producer Nagarjuna's home production Annapurna Studios. She started her Telugu film career with the film Rangula Ratnam where she sang the Birthday (Tic Toc) song and became the voice of Sithara (actress). She has also sung in the Hindi film Simply Ek Love Story.

She has also produced and composed many independent singles in the Kannada and Hindi languages, including "Nee Hinga Nodabyada". Her single "Neene Neene" was a collaboration with Sonu Nigam

Influences
One of SaRa's early musical influences was her mother herself, M K Sharadamba, who is a Carnatic classical musician. SaRa is highly influenced by western music and considers Mariah Carey & the late great Michael Jackson to be her western influences. She considers herself to be one of the biggest admirers of Sunidhi Chauhan.

Discography

As a playback singer

Independent Music

Awards

References

External links
 

Year of birth missing (living people)
Living people
Singers from Bangalore
Kannada playback singers
21st-century Indian singers
Women musicians from Karnataka
Indian women playback singers
21st-century Indian women singers
Telugu playback singers